Alvin A. Jaeger (born December 10, 1943) is an American politician and member of the Republican Party who had served as the Secretary of State of North Dakota from 1993 to 2023. Jaeger was elected to the office in 1992, and re-elected in 1996, 2000, 2004, 2006, 2010, 2014 and 2018.

Biography
Al Jaeger was born in Beulah, North Dakota in 1943. He was raised there and he graduated in 1961 from Beulah High School. He attended Bismarck State College and in 1963 earned an Associate of Arts degree. In 1966, he received a Bachelor of Science degree from Dickinson State University, majoring in Business Education with a minor in Speech. He also completed post-graduate work at the University of North Dakota in 1968 and at Montana State University in 1970.

During his high school and college years, Jaeger worked for his father's excavating and ready-mix concrete company. After graduating from Dickinson State, he taught at Killdeer High School for three years and then at Kenmare High School for another two years. Upon moving to Fargo, North Dakota in 1971, Jaeger worked for two years for the Mobil Oil Corporation as a marketing analyst. From 1973 to 1992, Jaeger was self-employed as a real estate broker and owned his own real estate brokerage business in Fargo.

Jaeger became North Dakota's fourteenth Secretary of State in 1993, and was reelected in 1996, 2000, 2004, 2006, 2010 and 2014.

In April 2018, Jaeger was defeated by Will Gardner at the North Dakota Republican Party, who thus secured the Republican nomination. The following month, Gardner withdrew from the race after revelations that he had pleaded guilty to a charge of disorderly conduct following a "Peeping Tom" incident in January 2006. Jaeger had said that he wouldn't run for re-election but with only Democratic-NPL candidate Josh Boschee on the ballot, Jaeger changed his mind and ran as an independent. He won the election with 47.27% of the vote and announced on election night that he would retire upon the conclusion of his eighth term.

He resides in Bismarck with his two daughters and a stepson from his wife Kathy, who passed away in 2016.

Electoral history

References

External links
North Dakota Secretary of State
Biography at NDSOS

|-

1943 births
Living people
20th-century American politicians
21st-century American politicians
Bismarck State College alumni
Dickinson State University alumni
Montana State University alumni
North Dakota Independents
North Dakota Republicans
Secretaries of State of North Dakota
People from Mercer County, North Dakota
University of North Dakota alumni